Museum of Aviation may refer to:

 Camden Museum of Aviation, Australia
 Museum of Aviation (Belgrade), Serbia
 Museum of Aviation (Košice), Slovakia
 Museum of Aviation (Warner Robins), Georgia, United States

See also
 
 List of aviation museums